Dorie Greenspan (born October 24, 1947) is an American author of cookbooks. The New York Times  called her a "culinary guru" in 2004.

Culinary career 

Greenspan has  won the James Beard Foundation Award five times, as well as the International Association of Culinary Professionals Cookbook of the Year Awards for Desserts by Pierre Hermé and Around My French Table, and Dorie's Cookies. She has also been listed on the James Beard Foundation's Who's Who of Food and Beverage in America.

She is among the first culinary professionals to produce cooking apps for mobile phones and tablet computers.

Personal life 

Greenspan lives in Manhattan, Paris and Westbrook, Connecticut.

Published works 

 Sweet Times: Simple Desserts for Every Occasion (1991)
 Baking with Julia: Savor the Joys of Baking with America's Best Bakers (1996) (based on the PBS series with Julia Child)
 Pancakes: From Morning to Midnight (1997)
 Waffles from Morning to Midnight (1997)
 Desserts by Pierre Hermé (1998) (with Pierre Hermé)
 Daniel Boulud's Cafe Boulud Cookbook: French-American Recipes for the Home Cook (1999) (with Daniel Boulud)
 Chocolate Desserts by Pierre Hermé (2001)
 Paris Sweets: Great Desserts From the City's Best Pastry Shops (2002)
 Baking: From My Home to Yours (2006) Named one of Southern Living’s100 Best Cookbooks of All Time
 Around My French Table: More Than 300 Recipes from My Home to Yours (2010)
 Baking Chez Moi: Recipes from My Paris Home to Your Home Anywhere (2014)
 Dorie's Cookies (2016) Named one of Southern Living’s100 Best Cookbooks of All Time
 Everyday Dorie: The Way I Cook (2018)
 Baking With Dorie: Sweet, Salty & Simple (2021)

References

American cookbook writers
Living people
James Beard Foundation Award winners
Women cookbook writers
20th-century American non-fiction writers
20th-century American women writers
21st-century American non-fiction writers
21st-century American women writers
American women non-fiction writers
1947 births